The femoral ring is the opening at the proximal, abdominal end of the femoral canal, and represents the (superiorly directed/oriented) base of the conically-shaped femoral canal. The femoral ring is oval-shaped, with its long diameter being directed transversely and measuring about 1.25 cm. The opening of the femoral ring is filled in by extraperitoneal fat, forming the femoral septum.

Part of the intestine can sometimes pass through the femoral ring into the femoral canal causing a femoral hernia.

Boundaries
The femoral ring is bounded as follows:
 anteriorly by the inguinal ligament.
 posteriorly by the pectineus and its covering fascia.
 medially by the crescentic base of the lacunar ligament.
 laterally by the fibrous septum on the medial side of the femoral vein.

Additional images

See also
 Femoral canal
 Femoral hernia
 Inguinal canal

References

External links
 

Lower limb anatomy